Ancient Hebrew (ISO 639-3 code ) is a blanket term for pre-modern varieties of the Hebrew language:

 Paleo-Hebrew (such as the Siloam inscription), a variant of the Phoenician alphabet
 Biblical Hebrew (including the use of Tiberian vocalization)
 Mishnaic Hebrew, a form of the Hebrew language that is found in the Talmud

See also
 Ancient Hebrew writings